Boadicea pelecoides is a moth of the subfamily Arctiinae first described by Tams in 1930. It is found in the Republic of the Congo.

References

Endemic fauna of the Republic of the Congo
Moths described in 1930
Lithosiini
Lepidoptera of the Republic of the Congo